Holly Hill is a city in Volusia County, Florida, United States. The population was 11,659 at the 2010 census. Holly Hill's city limits lie entirely on the Florida mainland, unlike the larger cities on either side of it, Daytona Beach and Ormond Beach, which encompass both the mainland and the barrier island (beach front) across the Halifax River.

Geography

Holly Hill is located at  (29.243808, –81.046476).

History

Holly Hill was incorporated in 1901. The original intention for incorporation was to force local owners of razorback hogs to keep their livestock penned up.

Demographics

At the 2000 census there were 12,119 people in 5,583 households, including 2,998 families, in the city. The racial makeup of the city was 87.10% White, 8.97% African American, 0.36% Native American, 1.00% Asian, 0.02% Pacific Islander, 0.91% from other races, and 1.63% from two or more races. Hispanic or Latino of any race were 3.69%.

Of the 5,583 households 22.3% had children under the age of 18 living with them, 34.9% were married couples living together, 13.6% had a female householder with no husband present, and 46.3% were non-families. 36.9% of households were one person and 17.2% were one person aged 65 or older. The average household size was 2.14 and the average family size was 2.77.

The age distribution was 19.9% under the age of 18, 7.0% from 18 to 24, 28.4% from 25 to 44, 23.5% from 45 to 64, and 21.2% 65 or older. The median age was 42 years. For every 100 females, there were 91.5 males. For every 100 females age 18 and over, there were 87.6 males.

The median household income was $26,651 and the median family income  was $29,154. Males had a median income of $25,946 versus $19,178 for females. The per capita income for the city was $16,098. About 13.5% of families and 16.5% of the population were below the poverty line, including 23.4% of those under age 18 and 12.1% of those age 65 or over.

City officials

Elected

 Chris Via, Mayor
 John Penny, City Commissioner, District 1  
 Penny Currie, City Commissioner, District 2 
 John C. Danio, City Commissioner, District 3
 Roy Johnson, City Commissioner, District 4

Appointed

 Joe Forte, City Manager
 Scott Simpson, City Attorney
 Jeffrey Miller, Interim Chief of Police

Notable people

 William S. McCoy, lived and worked in Holly Hill as a skilled yacht builder, prior to his entry into rum-running

References

External links
 City of Holly Hill official website

Cities in Volusia County, Florida
Populated places on the Intracoastal Waterway in Florida
Populated places established in 1901
Cities in Florida